Agha Ali Abbas Qizilbash (also known as Agha Talish) (13 November 1923 – 19 February 1998) was a Pakistani actor who made his debut in 1947 and was mostly known and recognized in Pakistan for playing character actor or villain roles. Talish was honoured by a Pride of Performance award, by the Government of Pakistan in 1989.

Life and career
Talish was born in Ludhiana, British India in 1923. His breakthrough film in Pakistan was film producer Saifuddin Saif's Saat Lakh (1957) where his on-screen performance for this popular hit song was widely admired, Yaaro Mujhe Maaf Rakho Mein Nashe Mein Hoon.

On 5 January 1962 Shaheed was released, his biggest hit film. A film on the relevant theme of Palestine with a script by Riaz Shahid and music by Rasheed Attre; it was produced and directed by Khalil Qaiser. The highlight was the instant hit Uss Bewafa Ka Sheher Hai Aur Hum Hain Dostau by renowned poet Muneer Niazi, music by Rasheed Attre.

Death
Talish died on 19 February 1998 after a long illness at Lahore, Pakistan. He had a 40-year-long film career.

Filmography 
 1947  Saraey Kay Baher
 1955	Jheel Kinarey
 1956	Jabroo, Miss 56, Baghi and Guddi Gudda
 1957	Saat Lakh, Sehti and Sardar
 1958	Touheed, Akhri Daao, Darbar-e-Habib and Aadmi
 1959	Boodi Shah, Sachey Moti, Neend, Raaz and Saathi
 1960	Rahguzar, Yeh Dunya, Allahdin Ka Beta, Salma, Sahil, Roop Mati Baz Bahadur and Saheli
 1961	Ajab Khan, Sunehrey Sapney, Farishta, Chotey Sarkar, Habu, Do Raste Gulfam, and Bara Bajey
 1962 Susral, Shake Hand, Azra, Qaidi, Paharan, Shaheed, Sukh Ka Sapna, Aulaad, Ghungat, Awaz Dey Kahan Hay, Dosheeza, Anchal
 1963	Baghawat, Kala Pani, Yahoodi Ki Larki, Baji, Daman, Mahndi Waley Hath, Chacha Khamkhowah, Seema
 1964	Chingari, Lutaira, Mama Jee, Piar Na Kar Naadan, Gehra Dagh, Shabab, Havaili, Landa Bazar and Farangi
 1965	Doli, Devdas, Aurat, Kaneez, Malangi and Raqqasa
 1966	Gawandi, Joker, Ruswai, Bharia Mela, Paidagir, Payal Ki Jhankar and Janbaz
 1967	Lakhon Mein Aik, Zinda Laash, Kafir, Shola Aur Shabnam, Hamraz, Hamdam, Imam Din Gohavia
 1968	Lala Rukh, Zindagi, Mafroor, Aurat Aur Zamana, Saiqa, Ashiq, Beti Beta, Dil Mera Dharkan Teri! Jang-e-Azadi, and Taj Mahal, Mera Ghar Meri Jannat
 1969	Andaleeb, Aneela, CID, Diya Aur Toofan, Jind Jaan, Neela Parbat, Piya Milan Ki Aas, Tere Ishq Nachaya, Zarqa, and Zindagi Kitni Haseen Hai
 1970	Shama aur parwana, Takht-o-taj, Maa puttar, Nya sawera, Darinda, Bedardi, Aik phool aik pathar, Charda sooraj and Rootha na karo
 1971	Dotsi, Bhen Bhara, Khak Aur Khoon, Yeh Aman, Neend Hamari Khwab Tumhare and Al-Asifa
 1972	Naag Muni, Bazar, Mere Hamsafar, Soudagar, Khoun apna koun paraya, Nizam, Ehsas, and Umrao Jaan Ada
 1973	Aan, Sarhad Ki Goad Mein, Jithey Vagdi Ay Ravi, Sadhoo aur Sheitan, and Baharon Ki Manzil
 1974	Main Bani Dulhan, Dillagi, Naukar Wohti Da, Imandar, Jawan mere des da, Laila Majnoon, Haqiqat, and Bahisht 1975	Zindagi tay toofan, Izzat, Farz aur mamta, 'Bay Aulad, Milap, Shireen Farhad, Zeenat, Aik Gunnah Aur Sahi, Naiki Badi, Ganwar and Umang 1976	Hukam da ghulam, Haibat Khan, Aulad, Chor noon mor, Kothey tapni, Mahboob mera mastana, Zaibunisa, Sachai, Sazish, Ann daata, Insanyat, Zuroorat, and Kil kil mera naan 1977	Ishq ishq, Haji Khokhar, Barey mian deewaney, and Salakhein 1978	Aag aur zindagi, Mazi haal mustaqbil, Inqilab, Seeta Maryam Margrete, Zindgi, Haider Ali, Playboy, and Aankhon Aankhon Mein 1979	Mohammed Bin Qasim 1980	Bandish, Sardar and Behram Daku 1981	Dil Ney Phir Yaad Kia, Watan, Alahdin, Basheera tey qanoon, Wafa, Do dil, Chan Suraj, and Sultan tey varyam 1982	Bara Bhai, and Tairey Bina Kiya Jeena 1983	Dehleez, Love Story, Wadda Khan, Rustam Tey Khan, Kala Samander 1984	Doorian, Kalia, Ucha Shimla Jatt Da, Chor Chowkidar, Dulla Bhati and Ishq Nachavey Gali Gali 1985	Dhee Rani, Ashyana, Deewaney Dou, Khuddar and Direct Hawaldar 1986	Domoro intiqam (Pushto), Baghi Sipahi (Punjabi), Malanga, Faisla and Nazdeekian 1987	Allah Rakha, Duniya and Nijat 1988	Mukhra, Roti, Baghi Haseena, Bano and Piasi 1989	Shani, Roop Ki Rani, Madam Bawri, Zabardast, Miss Allah Rakhi, Karmoo Dada, Rakhwala, Achoo 302, Mohabbat Ho Tau Aisi Ho, Nangi Talwar, Zakhmi Aurat and Gori Dian Jhanjhran 1990	Bulandi, Falak Shair, Dil and Nag Devta 1991	Adil 1993  Zabata 1994	Mohabbat Ki Aag, Sarkata Insaan and Pajero Group 1995	Mushkil and Ajab Khan''

Awards and recognition
 Six Nigar Awards in the years 1961, 1962, 1965, 1972, 1975 and 1994
 Pride of Performance award by the President of Pakistan in 1989

See also 
 List of Lollywood actors

References

External links
 

1926 births
1998 deaths
Pakistani male film actors
Punjabi people
Nigar Award winners
Recipients of the Pride of Performance